The Charlie Holt Team Sportsmanship Award  is an annual award given out at the conclusion of the Hockey East regular season, to the team who held the lowest Penalty Minutes Per Game average (PMPG) in conference games during the regular season.

The Team Sportsmanship Award was first awarded in 1992 and every year thereafter.

The current record for lowest PMPG in conference games in a season is held by Massachusetts with a 7.6 Penalty Minutes Per Game average, set during the 2020–21 season.

The award has been shared once, in 1998–99 between Merrimack and New Hampshire. 

The Wildcats have won the award a dominant ten times as well as in five consecutive seasons from 2009–10 to 2013–14.

Winners

See also
Hockey East Awards

References
General

Specific

External links

College ice hockey trophies and awards in the United States